Rush Township is a township in Susquehanna County, Pennsylvania, United States. The population was 1,134 at the 2020 census. The village of Lawton is in the township.

Geography

Demographics

As of the census of 2010, there were 1,267 people, 509 households, and 368 families residing in the township. The population density was 33 people per square mile (12.7/km2). There were 637 housing units at an average density of 16.6/sq mi (6.5/km2). The racial makeup of the township was 97.6% White, 0.3% African American, 0.2% Native American, 0.9% Asian, 0.7% from other races, and 0.2% from two or more races. Hispanic or Latino of any race were 1.8% of the population.

There were 509 households, out of which 29.9% had children under the age of 18 living with them, 59.9% were married couples living together, 6.3% had a female householder with no husband present, and 27.7% were non-families. 21.4% of all households were made up of individuals, and 10% had someone living alone who was 65 years of age or older. The average household size was 2.49 and the average family size was 2.86.

In the township the population was spread out, with 21.8% under the age of 18, 59.4% from 18 to 64, and 18.8% who were 65 years of age or older. The median age was 45 years.

The median income for a household in the township was $39,531, and the median income for a family was $37,955. Males had a median income of $35,521 versus $27,414 for females. The per capita income for the township was $20,222. About 5.1% of families and 9.6% of the population were below the poverty line, including 18.6% of those under age 18 and 5.8% of those age 65 or over.

References

Populated places established in 1794
Townships in Susquehanna County, Pennsylvania
Townships in Pennsylvania
1794 establishments in Pennsylvania